4834 Thoas  is a large Jupiter trojan from the Greek camp, approximately  in diameter. It was discovered on 11 January 1989, by astronomer Carolyn Shoemaker at the Palomar Observatory. The C-type asteroid is one of the 50 largest Jupiter trojans and has a rotation period of 18.19 hours. It was named after Thoas from Greek mythology.

Orbit and classification 

Thoas is a dark Jovian asteroid orbiting in the leading Greek camp at Jupiter's  Lagrangian point, 60° ahead of its orbit in a 1:1 resonance (see Trojans in astronomy). It is a non-family asteroid in the Jovian background population. It orbits the Sun at a distance of 4.5–5.9 AU once every 11 years and 11 months (4,356 days; semi-major axis of 5.22 AU). Its orbit has an eccentricity of 0.14 and an inclination of 28° with respect to the ecliptic.

The asteroid was first observed as  Crimea–Nauchnij in December 1975.

Physical characteristics 

Thoas is an assumed C-type asteroid.

Rotation period 

In September 1996, observations by Stefano Mottola using the now decommissioned Bochum 0.61-metre Telescope at ESO's La Silla Observatory in Chile gave a rotation period of 18.22 hours with a brightness amplitude of 0.14 magnitude. Between 2010 and 2015, refined photometric observations by Robert Stephens, Daniel Coley, Brian Warner and collaborators at the Center for Solar System Studies in Landers, California, gave three concurring periods of 18.14–18.216 hours and a brightness variation of 0.22–0.39 magnitude, with the best rated result of 18.192 hours and an amplitude of 0.22 magnitude.

Diameter and albedo 

According to the surveys carried out by the Infrared Astronomical Satellite IRAS, Japanese Akari satellite and the NEOWISE mission of NASA's Wide-field Infrared Survey Explorer, Thoas measures between 72.33 and 96.21 kilometers in diameter and its surface has an albedo between 0.040 and 0.085.

The Collaborative Asteroid Lightcurve Link derives an albedo of 0.0536 and a diameter of 86.90 kilometers based on an absolute magnitude of 9.1.

Naming 

This minor planet was named by the discoverer after the Greek hero Thoas from the Trojan War. Thoas was the commander of the Aetolians. He was impersonated by Poseidon, who, in Thoas's voice, rallied the Greeks and fought by their side in the shape of Thoas, when the Trojans were close to the Greek ships. The official naming citation was published by the Minor Planet Center on 25 August 1991.

Notes

References

External links 
 Asteroid Lightcurve Database (LCDB), query form (info )
 Dictionary of Minor Planet Names, Google books
 Discovery Circumstances: Numbered Minor Planets (1)-(5000) – Minor Planet Center
 
 

004834
Discoveries by Carolyn S. Shoemaker
Named minor planets
19890111